Colin Hufman  (born May 15, 1984) is an American curler. He was born in Fairbanks, Alaska, and resides in Minneapolis. He has been a USA Curling Board member since August 2017 and USA Curling Athlete Representative for the United States Olympic & Paralympic Committee Athletes Advisory Council since December 2020.

Career
In 2002, Hufman won the United States Junior Championship, playing third for Leo Johnson's team. Representing the United States at the 2002 World Junior Championships in Kelowna, Canada, they finished in ninth place with a 3–6 record.

Hufman has won numerous medals at the United States Men's Championship, including gold twice. In 2016 he won playing second for skip Brady Clark, but runner-up John Shuster earned enough points to earn the chance to represent the US at the World Championship that year. In 2018, Hufman won his second gold medal, this time playing second for Rich Ruohonen. At the  2018 World Men's Curling Championship, Team Ruohonen finished in sixth place with a 6–7 record.

At the 2020 United States Men's Championship, Hufman and Team Ruohonen earned a silver medal, losing to John Shuster in the final.

In 2021, Hufman played as the alternate for Team John Shuster at the 2021 World Men's Curling Championship in Calgary, Alberta. Due to the COVID-19 pandemic, the 2021 United States Men's Curling Championship was postponed until after the World Men's Championship and the United States Curling Association decided Team Shuster, the 2020 National Champions, would represent the U.S. at the Worlds. At the championship, the team led the U.S. to a 10–3 round robin record, in third place. They played Switzerland in the playoffs, in a game which was delayed a day due to some curlers testing positive for the virus. In the game, Switzerland, skipped by Peter de Cruz, beat the Americans to advance to the semifinals.

Personal life
Colin Hufman works as a mechanical engineer and is married to Microsoft Program Manager Erin Momany.

Teams

References

External links

Living people
1984 births
Sportspeople from Fairbanks, Alaska
American male curlers
American curling champions
Sportspeople from Minneapolis
Curlers at the 2022 Winter Olympics
Olympic curlers of the United States